Marianna Sutadi (born October 12, 1941 in Jakarta) was the Indonesian Ambassador to Romania and Moldova (appointed in 2010) as well as the "first and only deputy chief justice of the Supreme Court" (March 2004 until her retirement in November 2008).

Sutadi graduated from the Faculty of Law at the University of Indonesia in April 1964 and followed family tradition by becoming a judge.  Her career started in September 1964 at the Jakarta Special District Court in September 1964. In 1971, she was assigned to the North-East Jakarta District Court before she became an assistant to the Supreme Court judge from 1981–1984. She "was promoted to be high judge at the Tanjung Karang High Court and the Jakarta High Court until 1993."

Her husband, Sutadi Djajakusuma, was the Indonesian Ambassador to Brazil, Peru and Bolivia, based in Brazil.

References

Further reading
Senika apa berkutika: jejak langkah wanita pertama di jajaran pimpinan Mahkamah Agung : biografi Marianna Sutadi-Nasution, SH (Senika what: the footsteps of the first woman in the leadership of the Supreme Court: biography of Marianna Sutadi-Nasution, SH) PT Gramedia Pustaka Utama, 2020 

Living people
1941 births
People from Jakarta
Ambassadors of Indonesia to Romania
Women ambassadors
Ambassadors to Moldova
Women judges
University of Indonesia alumni
21st-century Indonesian judges
20th-century Indonesian judges